The 2018–19 Women's FA Cup  (also known as the SSE Women's FA Cup for sponsorship reasons) was the 49th staging of the Women's FA Cup, a knockout cup competition for women's football teams in England. Chelsea were the defending champions, having beaten Arsenal 3–1 in the previous final.

Teams 
A total of 293 teams had their entries to the tournament accepted by The Football Association. 199 teams entered in the preliminary round or first round qualifying. Teams that played in the FA Women's National League Division One were given exemption to the second round qualifying, while teams in the Northern and Southern Premier Divisions entered in the second round proper. Teams in the FA Women's Super League and FA Women's Championship were exempted to the fourth round proper. 

The Preliminary Round saw six ties cancelled due to the withdrawal of one of the teams with one additional tie cancelled due to Woodley United not being able to field a team. The First Round Qualifying saw five ties cancelled as a result of withdrawals with one additional tie cancelled due to the disqualification of Wealdstone. The Second Round Qualifying saw one tie cancelled due to the withdrawal of St Nicholas.

Preliminary round
There was no preliminary round in the original schedule of the competition. It was added by The Football Association as a result of increased entries into the competition. Fifty three matches were scheduled for the preliminary round, to be played by Sunday 26 August 2018. The first match was played on Friday 17 August 2018, with six more on Sunday 19 August 2018. One match was postponed from 26 August 2018, with another abandoned and replayed the following Sunday.

First round qualifying
Seventy three matches were scheduled for the first qualifying round. The 146 teams taking part consisted of 93 teams with a bye to this stage, plus 53 match winners from the previous round. Matches were played on the scheduled date of Sunday 2 September 2018, except two delays caused by matches from the previous round not yet having taken place and Swindon Spitfires v Southampton FC Women delayed due to the removal of Moneyfields from the competition.

Second round qualifying
Sixty matches were scheduled for the second qualifying round. The 120 teams taking part consisted of 47 FA Women's National League Division One teams exempted to this stage, plus the 73 match winners from the previous round. Most matches were played on Sunday 23 September, except seven which were postponed to the following week.

Third round qualifying
Thirty matches were scheduled for the third qualifying round. All were played on Sunday 7 October.

First round proper
Fifteen matches were scheduled for the first round proper. Most matches were played on Sunday 11 November 2018, the only exception being New London Lionesses v AFC Wimbledon which were postponed from the original scheduled date to the following week due to a waterlogged pitch. Cambridge City v Cambridge United was replayed on 25 November 2018 after the initial match took place on a pitch that was too small.

Second round proper
Twenty matches were scheduled for the second round proper. The 40 teams taking part consisted of 25 FA Women's National League Northern and Southern Division teams exempted to this stage, plus the 15 match winners from the previous round. Matches were played on Sunday 2 December, except three which were postponed to the following week.

Third round proper
Ten matches were scheduled for the third round proper. All were played on Sunday 6 January.

Fourth round proper
Sixteen matches were scheduled for the fourth round proper. The 32 teams taking part consists of 22 FA Women's Super League and FA Women's Championship teams exempted to this stage, plus the ten match winners from the previous round. Half of the matches were played on the weekend of Saturday 2 and Sunday 3 February, with the other half postponed to the following week as a result of bad weather.

Fifth round proper

Eight matches were scheduled for the fifth round proper. All were played on Sunday 17 February 2019.

Quarter-finals
The four matches of the quarter-finals were played on Sunday 17 March 2019.

Semi-finals

Final

Television rights

Notes

References

Women's FA Cup seasons
Cup